The 1987–88 Divizia B was the 48th season of the second tier of the Romanian football league system.

The format has been maintained to three series, each of them having 18 teams. At the end of the season the winners of the series promoted to Divizia A and the last four places from each series relegated to Divizia C.

Team changes

To Divizia B
Promoted from Divizia C
 Siretul Pașcani
 Inter Vaslui
 Petrolul Ianca Brăila
 Sportul 30 Decembrie
 Metalul București
 Sportul Muncitoresc Caracal
 Gloria Reșița
 Progresul Timișoara
 Sticla Arieșul Turda
 Minerul Baia Sprie
 Electromureș Târgu Mureș
 Metalul Plopeni

Relegated from Divizia A
 Jiul Petroșani
 Gloria Buzău
 Chimia Râmnicu Vâlcea

From Divizia B
Relegated to Divizia C
 Aripile Victoria Bacău
 ROVA Roșiori
 Aurul Brad
 Minerul Gura Humorului
 Carpați Mârșa
 Mureșul Deva
 Dunărea CSU Galați
 Automatica București
 Steaua CFR Cluj
 Poiana Câmpina
 IMASA Sfântu Gheorghe
 Minerul Cavnic

Promoted to Divizia A
 CSM Suceava
 ASA Târgu Mureș
 Politehnica Timișoara

Renamed teams
MF Steaua București was renamed as Mecanică Fină București.

Minerul Paroșeni was renamed as AS Paroșeni Vulcan.

Petrolul Ianca Brăila was renamed as Petrolul Ianca.

League tables

Serie I

Serie II

Serie III

See also 
 1987–88 Divizia A

References

Liga II seasons
Romania
2